Keisha Jackson (born August 17, 1965) is an R&B singer, and is the daughter of R&B & soul singer-songwriter Millie Jackson.

Having grown up in a family rich with music history, Keisha’s childhood was immersed in music. People like The Isley Brothers and The O’Jays would visit her house, and she worked as a background singer for her mom when she was fifteen.

Keisha Jackson went to college for two and a half years before moving to Atlanta, Georgia where she tried to pursue a music career. She formed a girl group with her friend called Obsession and played the clubs around the city of Atlanta.

Keisha then got an opportunity to put out some albums, and in 1989, released her self-titled debut. The album scored a minor hit with its single, “Hot Little Love Affair” which reached #39 on the charts. In 1991, Keisha released a second effort, titled Keisha, which had the single “Mature Love.” The track failed to make a big impression and peaked at #80 on the R&B charts.

In the time after, Keisha began working with LaFace Records as a background vocalist. She worked on tracks with Toni Braxton, Whitney Houston and Bobby Brown. She became involved with a Warner Bros. Records plan to make a group called Black Coffy and was signed to the project. However, the group was dropped before ever making any real recordings.

Today, Keisha continues to record and perform, and has started her own agency titled One Voice Entertainment.  She performs often as a backup singer with Erykah Badu's band. Other Celebrity background include, Joss Stone, Angie Stone, OutKast, Faith Evans and many more.

Discography
Keisha Jackson (1989)
Keisha (1991)

References

External links

1965 births
20th-century African-American women singers
American contemporary R&B singers
American soul singers
Living people
Musicians from Brooklyn
Musicians from Atlanta
Singers from New York City
21st-century African-American people
21st-century African-American women